Bir Nabala is a Palestinian enclave town in the West Bank located eight kilometers northeast of Jerusalem. In mid-year 2006, it had an estimated population of 6,100 residents. Three Bedouin tribes — Abu Dhak, Tel al ‘Adassa and Jahalin — live in Bir Nabala. Bir Nabala has a built-up area of 1,904 dunams, which combined with nearby al-Jib, Beit Hanina al Balad and al-Judeira form an enclave in the Seam Zone, walled in by the Israeli West Bank barrier. 

The enclave as a whole is home to approximately 15,000 Palestinians. It is linked to Ramallah by underpasses and a road that is fenced on both sides. From the Biddu enclave, residents travel along a fenced road that passes under a bypass road to Bir Nabala enclave, then on a second underpass under Bypass Road 443 to Ramallah.

Prior to the construction of the barrier, Bir Nabala was a commercial center linking Jenin and Tulkarm with the Jerusalem area and the town contained about 600 shops and six tyre factories. In 2007, there were 180 shops and two tyre factories.

History
The remains of a vault, dating to the Crusader era have been found here.

During the Mamluk era, a waqf stipulated that the whole of the revenue from Bir Nabala should got to the ad-Dawādāriyya Madrasa in Jerusalem. The building was completed in 695 AH/1295−1296CE.

Ottoman era
In 1517, the village was included in the Ottoman empire with the rest of Palestine and in the 1596 tax-records it appeared as Bir Nabala, located in the Nahiya of Jabal Quds of the Liwa of Al-Quds. The population was 4 households and 2 bachelors, all Muslim. They paid a fixed tax rate of 33.3% on agricultural products, which included wheat, barley, olive trees, vineyards, fruit trees, goats and beehives in addition to "occasional revenues"; a total of 1,300 akçe. 

In 1738 Richard Pococke named it Beerna–billiah, seeing it "on a hill to the east".

In 1838 Edward Robinson noted Bir Nebala on his travels in the region, as a Muslim village in El Kuds region. In May, 1863 Guérin found it to have about 130 inhabitants. He further noted remains from the Crusader era and a few rock-cut tombs, one of them still in use by the locals. An official Ottoman village list sometime around 1870 listed Bir Nebala as having 24 houses and a population of 100, though the population count included only men.

In 1883, the PEF's Survey of Western Palestine (SWP) described it as "a village of moderate size, standing high, with a valley to the west. There are a few olives round the place."

In 1896 the population of Bir Nebala was estimated to be about 420 persons.

British Mandate era
In the 1922 census of Palestine conducted by the British Mandate authorities, Bir Nebala had a population of 367 Muslims, increasing in the 1931 census to 456 Muslims, in 106 inhabited houses.

In the 1945 statistics the population of Bir Nebala consisted of 590 Muslims and the land area was 2,692 dunams, according to an official land and population survey. Of this, 962 dunams were designated for plantations and irrigable land, 783 for cereals, while 21 dunams were built-up (urban) areas.

Jordanian era
In the wake of the 1948 Arab–Israeli War, and after the 1949 Armistice Agreements, Bir Nabala came under Jordanian rule. It was annexed by Jordan in 1950.

In 1961, the population of Bir Nabala was 850.

Post-1967

Since the Six-Day War in 1967, Bir Nabala has been under Israeli occupation. The population in the 1967 census conducted by the Israeli authorities was 935, 19 of whom originated from Israeli territory. 

After the 1995 accords, 14.4% of Bir Nabala’s land was classified as Area B, while the remaining 85.6% was classified as Area C. Israel has confiscated 675 dunums from Bir Nabala in order to construct Atarot Industrial zone, in addition to isolating 1,121 dunams of Bir Nabala land behind the West Bank barrier.

References

Bibliography

  (p. 209)  
  

  

  (p. 5)

External links
Welcome To Bir Nabala
Survey of Western Palestine, Map 17:  IAA, Wikimedia commons 
Bir Nabala Town (Fact Sheet),   Applied Research Institute–Jerusalem (ARIJ)
 Bir Nabala Town Profile, ARIJ
 Bir Nabala aerial photo, ARIJ 
Locality Development Priorities and Needs in Bir Nabala 

Towns in the West Bank
Municipalities of the State of Palestine